Mount Usher Gardens located at Ashford, County Wicklow, Ireland, was laid out in 1868. It is spread on twenty acres of land along River Vartry, having more than 5000 plant species.

History 
The land now part of the garden was anciently part of a lake.

References 

Gardens in County Wicklow
1868 establishments in Ireland